Workers Revolutionary Party was a communist group in Kerala, India. It existed sometime around 1970, and had branches in Trivandrum, Ernakulam and Alappuzha. It was led by A. Achuthan.

References

Defunct political parties in Kerala
Defunct communist parties in India
Political parties established in the 1970s
1970s establishments in India
Political parties with year of disestablishment missing